Luis Miguel Franco Zamora (born 15 May 1993) is a Mexican professional footballer who plays as a midfielder for Liga FPD club Herediano.

Honours
Herediano
Liga FPD: Apertura 2021

References

External links
 

1993 births
Living people
Association football midfielders
Ballenas Galeana Morelos footballers
Club León footballers
Yalmakán F.C. footballers
Liga MX players
Liga Premier de México players
Tercera División de México players
Footballers from Michoacán
Mexican footballers
People from Zamora, Michoacán